Masters of Sex is an American period drama television series that premiered on September 29, 2013, on Showtime. It was developed by Michelle Ashford and loosely based on Thomas Maier's biography Masters of Sex. Set in the 1950s through the late 1960s, the series tells the story of Masters and Johnson (Dr. William Masters and Virginia Johnson) who are portrayed by Michael Sheen and Lizzy Caplan. The series has received critical acclaim. It was nominated for a Golden Globe Award for Best Drama Series in 2013. The series was canceled by Showtime on November 30, 2016, after four seasons.

Premise
The series explores the research and the relationship between William Masters (Michael Sheen) and Virginia Johnson (Lizzy Caplan), two pioneering researchers of human sexuality at Washington University in St. Louis, Missouri. The series begins in October 1956 and ends in August 1969 with the fourth season.

As noted by the Los Angeles Times television critic, the series "hangs on bones of fact"; "it's more useful for the viewer to think of it as all made up. Because, mostly, it is, and because to the extent it tells the story of two real people, it also adorns the telling with dramatic practicalities, invented characters and narrative detours. Indeed, it's down these side streets, casting a brief light on a passing character (patients, prostitutes, a provost's wife), that the show finds many of its best moments."

Other than principal characters, which are partly fictionalized, adults are significantly fictionalized, and children are entirely fictionalized. In real life, Masters and Johnson each have two children, but in the series they have three children each. Episodes featuring the children include a disclaimer stating that their storylines are "entirely fictitious". Series creator Michelle Ashford explained: "We are telling a non-fiction story and one where there are people who are still alive out there, and those people need to be protected. We were advised to add [the baby] to protect the people that are still alive. It wasn't a storytelling prerogative. It had to do with protecting living people."

Episodes

Cast and characters

Main
 Michael Sheen as Dr. William Masters
 Lizzy Caplan as Virginia Johnson
 Caitlin FitzGerald as Libby Masters
 Teddy Sears as Dr. Austin Langham (seasons 1–2, recurring seasons 3–4)
 Nicholas D'Agosto as Dr. Ethan Haas (season 1, guest season 2)
 Annaleigh Ashford as Betty Dimello (seasons 2–4, recurring season 1)

Recurring
 Beau Bridges as Barton Scully, medical school provost and longtime friend of William Masters (seasons 1–4)
 Allison Janney as Margaret Scully, Barton's wife (seasons 1–3)
 Rose McIver as Vivian Scully, Barton and Margaret's daughter (seasons 1–2)
 Heléne Yorke as Jane Martin, a hospital secretary and participant in the sex study (seasons 1–3)
 Kevin Christy as Lester Linden, the archivist of Masters and Johnson's work (seasons 1–4)
 Julianne Nicholson as Dr. Lillian DePaul, a doctor working in the Obstetrics Department of Washington University Hospital (seasons 1–2)
 Ann Dowd as Estabrooks 'Essie' Masters, William's mother (seasons 1–2)
 Mather Zickel as George Johnson, Virginia's ex-husband and father of her children (seasons 1–3)
 Cole Sand (seasons 1–2) and Noah Robbins (season 3) as Henry Johnson, Virginia's son
 Kayla Madison (seasons 1–2) and Isabelle Fuhrman (seasons 3–4) as Tessa Johnson, Virginia's daughter
 Greg Grunberg as Gene Moretti, Betty's husband (seasons 1–2)
 Finn Wittrock as Dale, a male prostitute whom Barton Scully patronizes (season 1)
 Garrett M. Brown as Chancellor Doug Fitzhugh, the head of a Washington University (seasons 1, 3)
 Brian Howe as Sam Duncan, chief of police (seasons 1–3)
 Elizabeth Bogush as  Elise Langham, Austin's wife (seasons 1–2)
 Betsy Brandt as Barbara Sanderson, Masters' new secretary, and later a patient of his clinic (season 2)
 Artemis Pebdani as Flo Packer, the owner of a diet pill company (season 2)
 Keke Palmer as Coral, the Masters' African-American nanny (season 2)
 Jocko Sims as Robert Franklin, Coral's brother and a civil rights activist (season 2)
 Sarah Silverman as Helen Schiff, Betty's lover (seasons 2–4)
 Christian Borle as Francis 'Frank' Masters, Jr., the younger brother of William Masters (season 2)
 Marin Ireland as Pauline Masters, Frank's wife (season 2)
 Danny Huston as Dr. Douglas Greathouse, the head of a hospital's Obstetrics Department (season 2)
 Courtney B. Vance as Dr. Charles Hendricks, the head of an African-American St. Louis hospital who seeks integration (season 2)
 Adam Arkin as Shep Tally, a PR expert hired by Masters and Johnson to help them present their work (season 2)
 Jack Laufer as Herb Spleeb, a lawyer (seasons 2–4)
 Josh Charles as Dan Logan (season 3)
 Jaeden Martell as Johnny Masters, Bill and Libby's son (seasons 3–4)
 Alyvia Alyn Lind as Jenny Masters, Bill and Libby's daughter (seasons 3–4)
 Ben Koldyke as Paul Edley, Master's neighbour (season 3)
 Susan May Pratt as Joy Edley, Master's neighbour (season 3)
 Colin Woodell as Ronald Sturgis (season 3)
 Emily Kinney as Nora Everett, a woman fascinated with Bill and Virginia's work who later becomes part of Bill's surrogacy program (season 3)
 Michael O'Keefe as Harry Eshelman, Virginia's father (seasons 3–4)
 Frances Fisher as Edna Eshelman, Virginia's mother (seasons 3–4)
 John G. Connolly as Hugh Hefner, editor-in-chief of Playboy (seasons 3–4)
 Danny Jacobs as Bob Drag, a publisher (seasons 3–4)
 Jeremy Strong as Dr. Art Dreesen, a psychologist who is brought in to help lessen Bill and Virginia's workload (season 4)
 Betty Gilpin as Dr. Nancy Leveau, Art's wife and a doctor who is brought in to help lessen Bill and Virginia's workload (season 4)
 Niecy Nash as Louise Bell, the head of Alcoholics Anonymous (season 4)
 David Walton as Bram Keller, Bill's lawyer (season 4)
 Nick Clifford as Guy (season 4)
 Kelli O'Hara as Dody Oliver, Bill's first love who did not answer his marriage proposal (season 4)

Development and production
Showtime ordered the pilot for Masters of Sex in August 2011, and greenlit it for series in June 2012, with the first season consisting of twelve episodes. Paul Bettany was originally cast as William Masters and had a say in the casting of the female lead which had reportedly stalled the process. After his exit, Michael Sheen replaced him and Lizzy Caplan was cast as Virginia Johnson.

Writer/producer Michelle Ashford serves as showrunner for Masters of Sex. She assembled a majority-female writing staff, although she says this was unintentional.

Ashford created the character of Barton Scully out of a combination of several men whom Masters knew. One of them was gay, but was not the man serving as provost during Masters' initial study.

Prop master Jeffrey Johnson noted the difficulty of obtaining accurate information about sexual devices from the time period. "They were so taboo it was hard to find research drawings. People didn’t even put them in writing." He obtained some vintage vibrators and dildos for use in the series along with acquiring condoms manufactured in the era (which did not have the reservoir tips of modern condoms). He designed "Ulysses", a transparent dildo with attached camera first seen in the pilot episode, from scratch, along with a diaphragm sizing kit seen in later episodes.

Annaleigh Ashford, who has a recurring role in the first season as Betty Dimello, was promoted to series regular in season two.

The opening credits sequence was created by design studio Elastic. The sequence, which includes suggestive, tongue-in-cheek sex metaphors and symbols, received a mixed response from critics; it placed on both best and worst lists for opening credit sequences. It was also nominated for the Primetime Emmy Award for Outstanding Main Title Design.

International broadcast
In Canada, the series debuted on September 29, 2013, on The Movie Network. In Australia, the series premiered on SBS One on October 3, 2013. In Ireland, the series premiered on October 4, 2013, on RTÉ Two. In the UK, it debuted on Channel 4 on October 8, 2013. In New Zealand, it debuted on SoHo on October 23, 2013. Virgin Media acquired the UK rights for Masters of Sex and it started airing on September 21, 2018. In the UK, the series is available on STV Player until February 2023.

Reception

Critical response

The first season of Masters of Sex received critical acclaim. Based on 58 reviews collected by Rotten Tomatoes, the first season received a 90% approval rating from critics, with a rating average of 8.26 out of 10. The site's consensus states: "Seductive and nuanced, Masters of Sex features smart performances, deft direction, and impeccable period decor." Metacritic gave the first season a score of 86 out of 100, based on 32 reviews. The American Film Institute listed it as one of the top ten television series of 2013.

Matt Roush of TV Guide wrote that "There is no more fascinating, or entertaining, new series this fall season." Diane Werts of Newsday gave it an "A" grade, complimenting the series on its use of humor, stating "its deft balance of epic scope and whimsical humanity", as well as the strong performances of the actors and creator Michelle Ashford's "scene-setting scripts". David Wiegand of the San Francisco Chronicle particularly praised the performances, calling them "extraordinary" and "stunning", and noting the series' A-list directors, among them Michael Apted and John Madden. Hank Stuever of The Washington Post wrote that after the first two episodes, "the characters get better and more complex, the story builds, strange things start to happen and now I can't wait to see how its interweaving plots unfold." Alan Sepinwall of HitFix praised lead actors Michael Sheen and Lizzy Caplan, calling them "terrific", and saying that "Masters of Sex is the best new show of the fall by a very long stretch. It's also a refreshing anomaly: a prestige cable drama that doesn't feel like a recombination of elements from 15 shows that came before it."  According to Robert Lloyd, the Los Angeles Times television critic, the show is a "handsome thing, another well-dressed romp through the American mid-century, when things (we imagine) were simpler and (so we like to think) less sophisticated, but also more exciting. And it's true that sexual naiveté of that age can seem incredible in a day when pornography is just another thing on your platform of choice. But even in an age when Masters of Sex is a TV show, the subject remains stubbornly powerful, private and confounding. We have come far, and we are still cavemen.

The second season also received critical acclaim equal to if not greater than the first season. It received a score of 89 out of 100 on Metacritic based on 17 reviews, indicating "universal acclaim". On Rotten Tomatoes, it has a 98% approval rating among critics based on 43 reviews, with a rating average of 8.52 out of 10. The consensus reads: "Boasting an expanded storyline and broader focus, Masters of Sexs second season improves on its already outstanding predecessor."

The third season received generally positive reviews from critics, although received more mixed reviews than the previous seasons. It has a Metacritic score of 72 out of 100 based on 15 reviews. On Rotten Tomatoes, it has a 69% approval rating among critics based on 32 reviews, with a rating average of 7.61 out of 10. The consensus reads, "With a six-year leap forward in the timeline, Masters of Sex takes an intriguing dramatic turn, but may leave a few viewers feeling frustrated."

The fourth season received generally positive reviews from critics. It has a Metacritic score of 70 out of 100 based on 5 reviews.

Awards and nominations

In June 2013, the series was honored, along with five others, with the Critics' Choice Television Award for Most Exciting New Series. The series received two nominations for the 2014 Writers Guild of America Awards, for Best New Series and Best Episodic Drama for "Pilot".  For the 71st Golden Globe Awards, the series was nominated for Best Drama Series, and Michael Sheen was nominated Best Drama Actor. For the 66th Primetime Emmy Awards, Lizzy Caplan received a nomination for Outstanding Lead Actress in a Drama Series, Beau Bridges received a nomination for Outstanding Guest Actor in a Drama Series, and Allison Janney won for Outstanding Guest Actress in a Drama Series.

References

External links

 

2013 American television series debuts
2016 American television series endings
2010s American LGBT-related drama television series
2010s American medical television series
American biographical series
English-language television shows
Serial drama television series
Lesbian-related television shows
Nudity in television
Television series about dysfunctional families
Television series set in the 1950s
Television series set in the 1960s
Television series set in the 1970s
Showtime (TV network) original programming
Television series by CBS Studios
Television series by Sony Pictures Television
Television shows set in St. Louis
Erotic drama television series